The 2023 Netball Quad Series was the eighth Netball Quad Series of test matches, contested by four of the five highest ranked nations in netball. The series was played in South Africa during January 2023, several months before the 2023 Netball World Cup held in the same venue.

Australia were the series champions, defeating New Zealand in the final by 56–50 to retain their title. It was Australia's seventh Quad Series trophy. New Zealand goal shooter Grace Nweke was named as the player of the series.

The series was broadcast in South Africa on SuperSport, Fox Sports in Australia, Sky Sports in the United Kingdom, and Sky Sport in New Zealand.

Teams

Squads

Notes:
 Jo Weston was ruled out of Australia's squad on 13 January 2023 due to injury, and was replaced by Tara Hinchliffe.
 Jo Harten was named in the England squad but returned to Australia due to injury.

Match officials

Umpires

Umpire Appointments Panel

Round-robin stage
The four teams played each other once in the round-robin stage, from which the top two sides advanced to the final to compete for the Quad Series title. The bottom two sides went to the third-place playoff.

Updated to 25 January 2023

Round 1

Round 2

Round 3

Finals

Third-place final

Final

References

2023
2023 in netball
2023 in Australian netball
2023 in New Zealand netball
2023 in English netball
2023 in South African women's sport
International netball competitions hosted by South Africa
January 2023 sports events in South Africa